Shocktrauma is a 1982 television film produced in Canada and syndicated nationally in the United States by sponsor General Foods. The screenplay by Stephen Kandel is based on the book by Jon Franklin and Alan Doelp, which details the true story of the first trauma center in America, founded in Baltimore, Maryland. It was directed by Eric Till.

Dick Atkins and Michael Lepiner were the executive producers, with Christopher Dalton and Wayne Fenske as producers. The production stars William Conrad as Dr. R Adams Cowley, the heart surgeon who pioneered trauma care. The film's score was composed by Eric Robertson.

Cast
 William Conrad as Dr. R Adams Cowley
 Philip Akin as Sam Hooke
 Leslie Carlson as Elton Bates
 Jim Chad as John Grady
 Lawrence Dane as Dr. Jordan Tracy
 Scott Hylands as Dr. "Tex" Goodnight
 Patricia Idlette as Nurse Malcolm
 Kerrie Keane as Jill Jackson
 Ken Pogue as Governor
 Linda Sorenson as Elizabeth Scanlan
 Beau Starr as Gene Kowalski

References

External links

1982 television films
1982 films
1982 drama films
Canadian drama television films
English-language Canadian films
Films directed by Eric Till
Films set in Baltimore
Films scored by Eric Robertson (composer)
American drama television films
1980s American films
1980s Canadian films